Sajan is a 1969 Indian Bollywood film directed by Mohan Segal. It stars Manoj Kumar and Asha Parekh in pivotal roles.  It became a hit at the box office.

The film was Shatrughan Sinha's debut in Hindi movies.

The first half of the movie was inspired by the 1951 movie Happy Go Lovely which has also inspired movies like Ghajini and Pasand Apni Apni.

The second half was largely inspired by the 1937 play I Killed the Count, of which there were several film, radio and television adaptations, including a 3-episode (Episode 25 - 27) story from Alfred Hitchcock Presents Season 2.

Cast
 Manoj Kumar as Ashok Saxena / Vinod
 Asha Parekh as Rajni
 Om Prakash as Driver Baalam
 Madan Puri as Seth Dharamdas a.k.a. Sheru
 Shatrughan Sinha as SI Tiwari (Introducing)
 Raj Mehra as Inspector Khan
 Sulochana Latkar as Laajwanti
 Gajanan Jagirdar as Guruji a.k.a. Roopa
 Jankidas Mehra as Tarakilal
 Shabnam as Bela
 Sapru as Jwala Prasad Saxena
 Murad as Judge
 Shammi as Aunty
 Iftekhar as Lawyer

Plot
Ashok (Manoj Kumar) comes from a business family and lives a very wealthy lifestyle. One day, while perusing newspapers he comes across an article which claims that he is to marry a dancer named Rajni (Asha Parekh). Angered at this insinuation, he goes to confront Rajni, all ready to threaten with a lawsuit, but is instead bewitched by her beauty and innocence and ends up falling in love with her. Initially, he does not reveal his real identity, but does inform her eventually, and both are ready to take the next step, of marriage. Before that could happen, both get embroiled in the murder of Dharamdas (Madan Puri) who has been blackmailing Rajni's mother (Sulochana) for a past secret about her husband. A murder that ends up having three different killers - Ashok, Rajni and Ashok's driver Balam (Om Prakash). But all are confessing to the same murder with different versions to investigating officers Inspector Khan (Raj Mehra) and SI Inspector Tiwari (Shatrughan Sinha), who are totally perplexed knowing that each of them are trying to save the others. Finally during a court scene for the murder trial, the actual murderer ????? confesses the crime and all three are acquitted.

Soundtrack
 "Ae Mere Meharban" - Lata Mangeshkar
 "Bansuri Tihari Nandlal" - Asha Bhosle
 "Resham Ki Dori" - Mohammed Rafi, Lata Mangeshkar
 "Saajan Saajan Pukaroon" (female) - Lata Mangeshkar
 "Saajan Saajan Pukaroon" - Mohammed Rafi
 "Baton Karo Raton Mein" - Lata Mangeshkar

References

External links

1960s Hindi-language films
1969 films
Films scored by Laxmikant–Pyarelal